Barrhead railway station may refer to one of four railway stations in the town of Barrhead, Renfrewshire, Scotland:

 Barrhead railway station, on the Glasgow, Barrhead and Kilmarnock Joint Railway
 Barrhead (New) railway station, on the Paisley and Barrhead District Railway, closed
 Barrhead South railway station, on the Paisley and Barrhead District Railway, closed
 Barrhead Central railway station, on the G&SWR Barrhead Branch, closed

See also
 Barrhead (disambiguation)